Tomasz Markowski may refer to:

 Tomasz Markowski (chess player) (born 1975), Polish chess Grandmaster
 Tomasz Markowski (politician) (born 1968), Polish politician

See also
Markowski